KAGJ (88.9 FM) is a radio station broadcasting a variety format. Licensed to Ephraim, Utah, United States, the station is currently owned by Snow College.

History

Snow College's early and sporadic efforts in radio included the first noncommercial FM station in the state of Utah, though its broadcasts were intermittent due to funding and administrative issues. Later, the school obtained 10-watt KEPH, which broadcast on 89.5 MHz between 1971 and 1978. More than a decade later, Snow College received another station on the same frequency, and on April 4, 1994, KAGJ went on the air.
In 2011, the station moved to 88.9 and relocated its tower to a mountain, resulting in a much larger coverage area that included Gunnison.

References

External links

FCC History Cards for KEPH

Radio stations established in 1994
AGJ
1994 establishments in Utah